Daniel Guldemont (born 27 October 1953) is a Belgian judoka. He competed in the men's middleweight event at the 1976 Summer Olympics.

References

1953 births
Living people
Belgian male judoka
Olympic judoka of Belgium
Judoka at the 1976 Summer Olympics
Sportspeople from Charleroi
20th-century Belgian people